John Sandeman Allen (30 May 1892 – 29 September 1949) was a British Conservative Party politician. He was a Member of Parliament (MP) for Birkenhead West from 1931 to 1945. At the 1945 general election he stood in the previously Conservative-held South Norfolk constituency, but the  Labour candidate, Christopher Mayhew, was elected as the constituency's MP.

References

External links 
 

1892 births
1949 deaths
Conservative Party (UK) MPs for English constituencies
UK MPs 1931–1935
UK MPs 1935–1945